Block floating point (BFP) is a method used to provide an arithmetic approaching floating point while using a fixed-point processor. BFP assigns a group of significands (the non-exponent part of the floating-point number) to a single exponent, rather than single significand being assigned its own exponent. BFP can be advantageous to limit space use in hardware to perform the same functions as floating-point algorithms, by reusing the exponent; some operations over multiple values between blocks can also be done with a reduced amount of computation.

The common exponent is found by data with the largest amplitude in the block. To find the value of the exponent, the number of leading zeros must be found (count leading zeros). For this to be done, the number of left shifts needed for the data must be normalized to the dynamic range of the processor used. Some processors have means to find this out themselves, such as exponent detection and normalization instructions.

Block floating-point algorithms were extensively studied by James Hardy Wilkinson.

BFP can be recreated in software for smaller performance gains.

See also 
 Binary scaling
 Fast Fourier transform (FFT)
 Digital signal processor (DSP)

References

Further reading
 

Floating point
Computer arithmetic